Bruno Piceno Hurtado (born July 6, 1991, in San Diego, California) is an American former footballer.

Club career

Club Tijuana
In 2008, Bruno Piceno started his professional soccer career at Club Tijuana Xoloitzcuintles De Caliente. In 2010, he helped Tijuana obtain the Apertura 2010 champions. Then on May 21, 2011, his team advanced to the Primera División.

Titles

References

External links
 
 
 

1991 births
Living people
American soccer players
Mexican footballers
Association football forwards
Club Tijuana footballers
Dorados de Sinaloa footballers
Cafetaleros de Chiapas footballers
Albinegros de Orizaba footballers
Real Cuautitlán footballers
Liga MX players
Ascenso MX players
Liga Premier de México players
Tercera División de México players
Sportspeople from Tijuana
Soccer players from San Diego
American sportspeople of Mexican descent